Argentinoeme schulzi is a species of beetle in the family Cerambycidae. It was described by Bruch in 1911.

References

Oemini
Beetles described in 1911